Pony Poindexter Plays the Big Ones is an album by saxophonist Pony Poindexter which was released on the New Jazz label in 1963.

Reception

Allmusic awarded the album 4 stars.

Track listing 
 "Midnight in Moscow" (Kenny Ball) - 4:16
 "Moon River" (Henry Mancini, Johnny Mercer) - 4:38
 "Twistin' USA" (Kal Mann) - 4:49
 "Poinciana" (Nat Simon, Buddy Bernier) - 3:23 		
 "Love Me Tender" (Vera Matson, Elvis Presley) - 5:09 		
 "Green Eyes" (Nilo Menéndez, Adolfo Utrera, Eddie Rivera, Eddie Woods) - 3:01
 "Fly Me to the Moon" (Bart Howard) - 4:07
 "San Antonio Rose" (Bob Wills) - 3:04

Personnel 
Pony Poindexter - alto saxophone, soprano saxophone 
Gildo Mahones - piano 
George Tucker - bass
Jimmie Smith - drums

References 

Pony Poindexter albums
1963 albums
New Jazz Records albums
Albums recorded at Van Gelder Studio
Albums produced by Ozzie Cadena